Gao Xin may refer to:

Gao Xin (tennis) (born 1994), Chinese tennis player
Gao Xin (footballer) (born 1997), Chinese footballer
Emperor Ku, legendary sovereign of China, also known as Gaoxin

See also
Gao Xing (born 1974), Chinese amateur astronomer